Kömürcükadı is a village in the Mustafakemalpaşa district of Bursa Province in Turkey.

References

Villages in Mustafakemalpaşa District